The Zanzibar bushbaby, Matundu dwarf galago, Udzungwa bushbaby, or Zanzibar galago (Paragalago zanzibaricus) is a primate of the family Galagidae. Like other species of galagos, its diet consists mainly of fruit, insects, and tree gums.

It is the most widespread and abundant bushbaby in the coastal forests of Tanzania. It is thought to prefer the mid to high canopy of tropical coastal forest, submontane and lowland tropical forest. It has one or two young per year.

There are two subspecies of this bushbaby:
P. z. zanzibaricus, from Zanzibar
P. z. udzungwensis, from mainland Tanzania

References

Zanzibar bushbaby
Mammals of Tanzania
Endemic fauna of Tanzania
Zanzibar
Zanzibar bushbaby